The 2007 America's Cup was the thirty-second challenge for the America's Cup  and was won by Alinghi in the 7th race. The Cup is the most famous and most prestigious regatta and Match Race in the sport of sailing.

As per the Deed of Gift of the America's Cup the yacht club that holds the Cup is the one that chooses the location for the next challenge to take place.  Alinghi, the syndicate representing the Société Nautique de Genève, the winners of the thirty-first edition, are based in Switzerland which is a landlocked country, so Alinghi put the hosting rights out to a competitive bid process. During a preliminary selection the bids of Barcelona, Palma de Mallorca, Porto Cervo and Elba were eliminated. The four finalists were Cascais (near Lisbon), Marseille, Naples (ITA) and Valencia. On November 27, 2003, it was announced that the venue would be Valencia, Spain. A new building, Veles e Vents designed by David Chipperfield, was built in the harbour of Valencia to house the central base for all the America's Cup teams.

By winning the 32nd America's Cup, Alinghi changed what seemed to have become a tradition: that the winner of race three goes on to win the match. Emirates Team New Zealand, despite winning the third heat, was not able to capture the Cup. The score of the 32nd America's Cup has also differentiated the match from previous editions. The past three America's Cups – 1995, 2000 and 2003 – were all sweeps.

Eleven challengers from nine countries submitted formal entries prior to the closing deadline of April 29, 2005.

Challenger selection - Louis Vuitton Cup 2007

In preparation for the 2007 America's Cup, there were a series of regattas leading up to the Cup races, called "Acts" which culminated in the 2007 Louis Vuitton Cup. The winner, Emirates Team New Zealand, became the Challenger and raced against the Defender, Alinghi, for the America's Cup.

In 2004, there were three acts, Act 1 held September 2004 in Marseille, France; Act 2 held October 2004 in Valencia, Spain; and Act 3 held October 2004, also in Valencia. These events featured fleet and match racing between America's Cup class yachts representing the syndicates that were vying for selection as challenger for the America's Cup in 2007. Points were awarded for each Act, and the team with the highest score at the end of the year is declared the ACC (America's Cup Class) Champion for that year. In 2004, Emirates Team New Zealand narrowly won over second place American challenger BMW Oracle Racing and third place Swiss defender Team Alinghi.

The schedule of Acts in 2005 included Acts 4 and 5 in Valencia (June 16-June 26), Acts 6 and 7 in Malmö, Sweden (August 25-September 4) and Acts 8 and 9 in Trapani, Italy (September 29-October 9).

2007 America's Cup program and results

In the results table below, the team entering the starting area from the  side (i.e. entering from the right-hand side on starboard tack) has a slight advantage. The  team was decided for the first race by the toss of a coin.   side advantage then alternates race by race.

Race Deltas

Crew

Alinghi

Peter Evans sailed the training boat for Alinghi. Other team members included Peter Holmberg, Mike Drummond, Matt Mitchell, Brian Sharp, Mark Newbrook, Jordi Calafat, Nicholas Texier and Craig Satherwaite. Grant Simmer was the managing director and Jochen Schümann the sports director.

Emirates Team New Zealand

Ben Ainslie and Kelvin Harrap sailed the training boat for Team New Zealand.

References and notes

See also 
America's Cup
Louis Vuitton Cup
Louis Vuitton Cup 2007

External links
32nd America's Cup Official Website
 3D visualization of the races
Peter Lester NZ yachting commentator
AC 32 Challenger Commission Official website of the Challenger Commission for the 32nd America's Cup in Valencia
Team Alinghi Official website the America's Cup Defender
BMW Oracle Racing Official website of Challenger of Record of the America's Cup
CupInfo.com America's Cup News and Information for 2007
America's Cup News, articles & photos
Valencia Sailing Website with original photos and commentary on all America's Cup related activity
Cup In Europe web site Exhaustive information, photos and commentary in French.
Coupe de l'America French website about the competition.
Mariantic America's Cup News & Views
2007AC.com - America's Cup Forums
South African team website
The effect of the America's cup on the city of Valencia article at ErasmusPC

 
2007
America's Cup, 2007
America's Cup, 2007
America's Cup, 2007
March 2007 sports events in Europe